Smith Lake is a lake in Wright County, in the U.S. state of Minnesota.

Smith Lake was named for Eugene Smith, a pioneer who settled there in 1858.

See also
List of lakes in Minnesota

References

Lakes of Minnesota
Lakes of Wright County, Minnesota